The 2004 Scheldeprijs was the 91st edition of the Scheldeprijs cycle race and was held on 14 April 2004. The race was won by Tom Boonen of the Quick-Step team.

General classification

References

2004
2004 in road cycling
2004 in Belgian sport